Khiri Rat Nikhom is a district (amphoe) in western Surat Thani province, southern Thailand.

Geography 
The western part of the district is in the hills of the Phuket mountain range, while to the east the terrain is mostly flat. The main rivers are the Phum Duang and Yan Rivers.

A portion of the Khlong Saeng Wildlife Sanctuary occupies the district.

Neighboring districts are (from north clockwise): Vibhavadi, Phunphin district, Khian Sa, Phanom, and Ban Ta Khun.

History 
The town was first mentioned during the reign of King Mongkut (Rama IV), when it was a minor mueang under Takua Pa and part of the Nakhon Si Thammarat Kingdom. During the thesaphiban administrative reforms in the 1890s it became a district in Chaiya Province, present day Surat Thani.

In 1917 the district was renamed Tha Khanon (ท่าขนอน), as the district office was in that area. On 12 April 1961 the name was changed back to its historical name.

Transport
Khiri Rat Nikhom is the endpoint of a branch of the southern railway, originally planned to run to Phuket, but construction was halted in 1956.

Administration 
The district is divided into eight sub-districts (tambons), which are further subdivided into 84 villages (mubans). Tha Khanon has sub-district municipality (thesaban tambon) status and covers parts of tambon Tha Khanon. Each of the eight tambons is administered by a tambon administrative organization (TAO).

The missing numbers 4 and 5 are tambons which were split off to form  Vibhavadi District.

References

External links 
amphoe.com
https://web.archive.org/web/20070615162932/http://cddweb.cdd.go.th/khirirat/index.htm

Khiri Rat Nikhom